Atsunori Inaba (稲葉 篤紀, born August 3, 1972) is a Japanese professional baseball manager, coach and former player. He was the Most Valuable Player of the 2006 Japan Series. He is currently the general manager for the Hokkaido Nippon-Ham Fighters of Nippon Professional Baseball's Pacific League.

After the retirement, he became Japan national baseball team at the 2013 exhibition game against Chinese Taipei, 2014 MLB Japan All-Star Series, 2015 exhibition game against All Euro, 2015 WBSC Premier12, 2016 exhibition game against Chinese Taipei, 2016 exhibition game against Mexico and Netherlands, 2017 exhibition game against CPBL All-Stars, and 2017 World Baseball Classic.

On July 31, 2017, he became Japan national baseball team manager. He managed at the 2017 Asia Professional Baseball Championship, 2018 exhibition game against Australia, 2018 U-23 Baseball World Cup and 2018 MLB Japan All-Star Series.

References

External links

 Career statistics - NPB.jp 

1972 births
Living people
People from Kitanagoya
Baseball players at the 2008 Summer Olympics
Hokkaido Nippon-Ham Fighters players
Hosei University alumni
Japanese baseball coaches
National baseball team managers
Nippon Professional Baseball coaches
Nippon Professional Baseball first basemen
Nippon Professional Baseball right fielders
Olympic baseball players of Japan
Baseball people from Aichi Prefecture
Yakult Swallows players
2009 World Baseball Classic players
2013 World Baseball Classic players